Olimpija Ljubljana may refer to:
HDD Olimpija Ljubljana, an ice hockey club dissolved in 2017
HK Olimpija, a current ice hockey club
KK Cedevita Olimpija, a basketball club formed in 2019
KK Olimpija, a defunct basketball club
NK Olimpija Ljubljana, an association football club established in 2005 as NK Bežigrad
NK Olimpija Ljubljana (1945–2005), a defunct association football club
RK Olimpija, a team handball club
ŽNK Olimpija Ljubljana, a women's football club

Sports clubs in Ljubljana